Rodolfo Antonio Zelaya García (born 3 July 1988) is a Salvadoran professional footballer who plays as a second striker for Primera División club Alianza and the El Salvador national team. In October 2013, Zelaya was given a one-year ban from football for his involvement in a match-fixing scandal with the El Salvador national team.

Club career

San Rafael
Zelaya started his career playing for San Rafael in 2004, where he played for one year. The following season, he moved to Atlético La Merced.

In July 2006, both Zelaya and Rúsvel Saravia were offered contracts to play for one of El Salvadors biggest clubs, Águila. Unfortunately for both Zelaya and Saravia, they could not come to terms with the club over their proposed salaries, and as a result, the transfer fell through.

Intipucá
Zelaya then moved on to play in Segunda División with Intipucá. After 2 years with the club, Zelaya caught the attention of Chalatenango coach Vladan Vićević.

Chalatenango
After meeting with Vićević, Zelaya was offered, and accepted a contract to play with his first Primera División club Chalatenango. Zelaya went on to impress in his first season with the club and grew a fan base with both spectators and reporters for being one of El Salvador's most promising young strikers.

Chalatenango finished in fifth place in the league table with 25 points. Zelaya scored 8 goals at the end of the Clausura 2008.

Alianza
In 2008, Zelaya moved to Alianza after former Chalatenango president Lisandro Pohl switched clubs. This switch lead to Pohl taking various players with him to Alianza whose rights he supposedly owned due to them being bought when he was president at Chalatenango.

Mexico
On 15 June 2009, Zelaya was one of the three Salvadoran footballers signed to Mexican club León on a loan deal, the other two were Cristian Castillo and Julio Enrique Martínez. On 3 December 2009, it was announced that Club León had permanently signed Zelaya along with the other two Salvadorans with a three-year contract.

On 12 December 2009, it was confirmed by Alianza's own president, Lisandro Pohl, that Zelaya would return to Alianza on a loan deal. Zelaya later played without a loan deal and participated at the Clausura 2011, where he was top goalscorer with 13 goals to his part.

He also had the opportunity to reign champion and score 2 goals at the final to give his team the tournament.

Russia

On 19 July 2011, Zelaya signed with  Russian First Division club Alania Vladikavkaz on a loan transfer for six months. Alania may be able to redeem his transfer by January 2012.

On 9 August 2011, Zelaya debuted at the Russian league championship in a match against Torpedo Vladimir as a starter. On 4 November, he scored two goals against Mordovia Saransk, but also received a knee injury that would rule him out for 7 months.
 
During the summer of 2012, Alania decided not to keep him and sent him back to Alianza.

On 26 January 2013, he once again signed a six-month loan to rejoin Alania Vladikavkaz, who had been promoted to the Russian Premiere League.

He was sent back to Alianza in June after his contract expired.

Return to Alianza
In June 2014, Zelaya signed again with Alianza.

Zelaya scored four goals in a 7–0 victory against Chalatenango in the second leg of the quarterfinals of the Apertura 2018, at the Estadio Cuscatlán, in December 2018. Alianza reached the semi-finals.

Los Angeles FC
On 30 January 2019, it was announced that Zelaya would join Major League Soccer club Los Angeles FC. In January 2020, the club announced that it and Zelaya had mutually agreed to part ways.

Las Vegas Lights (loan)
On 15 August 2019, Zelaya was loaned to USL Championship side Las Vegas Lights FC.

International career
Zelaya officially received his first cap on 23 April 2008, in a friendly match against China.

He scored his first goal with the national team on 6 September 2008, in a 2010 FIFA World Cup qualification match against Haiti. This game also saw him score his first hat-trick which lead El Salvador to a 5–0 win against the then Caribbean Nations Cup champions.

At the 2011 CONCACAF Gold Cup, Zelaya received two trophies for the best player in the matches against Cuba and Panama. Overall, Zelaya scored 4 goals being the second top goalscorer of the tournament.

Zelaya was noted by Goal.com as being one of the Best XI of the 2011 CONCACAF Gold Cup — alongside Javier Hernández as forwards. CONCACAF also noted "Fito" scoring the fifth best goal of the tournament, a decent feat considering 80 goals scored in the tournament.

According to IFFHS (International Federation of Football History & Statistics) Rodolfo Zelaya was one of the most skilled and popular Central American players of 2012. After being out of action for almost a year due to injury Zelaya, was selected to represent El Salvador for the 2013 CONCACAF Gold Cup scoring all four goals for the team leading them to the Quarter-finals, as well as being named one of the best players of the tournament.

Scoring two goals versus Trinidad & Tobago, one goal versus Haiti, and versus United States, several critics said that Zelaya was the only player that makes a big difference in the field, due to his dribbling skills and ability to score.

In September 2013, Zelaya was handed a one-year ban from international football for his involvement in a match-fixing scandal with the El Salvador national football team. This ban was extended to worldwide in October of the same year.

Career statistics

Club

International

Scores and results list El Salvador's goal tally first, score column indicates score after each Zelaya goal.

Honors
Alianza
Primera División Winner (3): Clausura 2011, Apertura 2015, Apertura 2017, Clausura 2018

Individual
Alania Vladikavkaz Player of the Year – 2011
Univision Goal of the Year – 2011
CONCACAF Gold Cup Best XI – 2011, 2013

References

External links

 
 
 

1988 births
Living people
People from Usulután Department
Association football forwards
Salvadoran footballers
El Salvador international footballers
2009 UNCAF Nations Cup players
2009 CONCACAF Gold Cup players
2011 CONCACAF Gold Cup players
2013 CONCACAF Gold Cup players
2017 Copa Centroamericana players
2017 CONCACAF Gold Cup players
C.D. Chalatenango footballers
Alianza F.C. footballers
Salvadoran expatriate footballers
Club León footballers
Expatriate footballers in Mexico
FC Spartak Vladikavkaz players
Expatriate footballers in Russia
Russian Premier League players
Sportspeople involved in betting scandals
Los Angeles FC players
Las Vegas Lights FC players
USL Championship players
Celaya F.C. Premier players
Major League Soccer players